Victor Ling,  (born 1943) is a Canadian researcher in the field of medicine. Ling's research focuses on drug resistance in cancer. He is best known for his discovery of P-glycoprotein, one of the proteins responsible for multidrug resistance.

Early life
Ling was born in Shanghai, China in 1943, and is of Teochew ancestry. He moved to Hong Kong with his family in 1949 and lived there until 1952, when they emigrated to Canada. He graduated from North Toronto Collegiate in 1962. He received his bachelor's degree in 1966 from the University of Toronto and his PhD in 1969 from the University of British Columbia.

Career 
Ling undertook post-doctoral training with Nobel laureate Fred Sanger at Cambridge University before returning to Toronto. He is currently Assistant Dean of the Faculty of Medicine at the University of British Columbia and former Vice-President, Discovery at the BC Cancer Agency in Vancouver, British Columbia, as well as the President and Scientific Director of the Terry Fox Research Institute.

Honours 
1990, awarded the Gairdner Award from the Gairdner Foundation for outstanding contributions to medical science
1991, awarded the Charles F. Kettering Prize
1991, awarded the Steiner Award, the highest honour in cancer research
1994, awarded the Robert L. Noble Prize by the National Cancer Institute of Canada
2000, appointed to the Order of British Columbia
2006, awarded an honorary doctorate from Trinity Western University
2008, made an Officer of the Order of Canada

References

External links
Webpage at the BC Cancer Research Centre
Webpage at the University of British Columbia Department of Biochemistry and Molecular Biology

1943 births
Canadian medical researchers
Cancer researchers
Chinese emigrants to Canada
Living people
Members of the Order of British Columbia
Naturalized citizens of Canada
Officers of the Order of Canada
Scientists from Shanghai
University of British Columbia alumni
Academic staff of the University of British Columbia
University of Toronto alumni